Play the Blues: Live from Jazz at Lincoln Center is a 2011 live album by Eric Clapton and Wynton Marsalis.  Released on September 13, it contains live recordings of the 2011 collaboration at the Lincoln Center for the Performing Arts between the British blues guitarist and the American jazz trumpeter. A video release accompanies the audio recordings. The live album reached various national charts and was certified in several territories.

Track listing

CD 
"Ice Cream" – 7:38
"Forty-Four" – 7:13
"Joe Turner's Blues" – 7:48
"The Last Time" – 4:18
"Careless Love" – 7:43
"Kidman Blues" – 4:21
"Layla" – 9:09
"Joliet Bound" – 3:50
"Just A Closer Walk With Thee" – 12:20
"Corrine, Corrina" – 10:22

DVD-Video 
"Ice Cream" 
"Forty-Four"
"Joe Turner's Blues"
"The Last Time" 
"Careless Love" 
"Kidman Blues" 
"Layla"
"Joliet Bound" 
"Just A Closer Walk With Thee" 
"Corrine, Corrina" 
"Stagger Lee" - Taj Mahal

Chart performance
In the United Kingdom, Play the Blues: Live from Jazz at Lincoln Center reached position 40 on the official album charts, which contains the summary of digital downloads and physical album sales. In addition, the release positioned itself on number 91 on the download album chart and peaked at number 34 on the physical album sales chart. In the United States, the collaboration effort peaked at number 31 on Billboard magazine's Top 200 album chart, selling more than 18,000 copies in the first week. While on the American album chart in 2011, the album sold 40,000 copies in total. Play the Blues: Live from Jazz at Lincoln Center also reached number one on the Blues albums sales chart, which is also compiled by the Billboard magazine. In New Zealand, the live album reached number 40 on the Recorded Music NZ chart. The release was awarded with several certification awards worldwide, gaining gold presentations for outstanding album sales in Brazil, Spain and Sweden, and becoming a platinum album in Croatia, Germany and Poland with a double platinum sales award. For the video release, Play the Blues: Live from Jazz at Lincoln Center was certified with a platinum presentation award record breaking sales in Brazil, Macao and Portugal.

Personnel 
 Eric Clapton – vocals, guitar
 Wynton Marsalis – trumpet
 Don Vappie – banjo, guitar
 Taj Mahal – vocals, guitar
 Dan Nimmer – piano
 Chris Stainton – keyboards
 Carlos Henriquez – bass
 Ali Jackson – drums, tambourine
 Marcus Printup – trumpet
 Victor Goines – tenor sax, soprano sax, clarinet, bass clarinet
 Chris Crenshaw – trombone, vocals on "Joliet Bound"

Chart positions

Weekly charts

Certifications

Album

Video

References

2011 live albums
Collaborative albums
Eric Clapton live albums
Live jazz albums
Reprise Records live albums
Warner Records live albums
Wynton Marsalis live albums